The following is an episode list of the American situation comedy According to Jim.

Series overview

Episodes

Season 1 (2001–02)

Season 2 (2002–03)

Season 3 (2003–04)

Season 4 (2004–05)

Season 5 (2005–06)

Season 6 (2007)

Season 7 (2008)

Season 8 (2008–09)

References

According to Jim

it:La vita secondo Jim#Episodi